Stephen Amoanor Kwao (born 12 September 1951) is a Ghanaian educationist and politician. He a former Member of Parliament for the Upper Manya constituency and a Minister of State at the Office of the President of Ghana. He is also a former deputy director of the Ghana Education service as well as a former national secretary of the National Democratic Congress. He is also a former minister for Employment and Social Welfare.

Early life and education
Stephen Kwao was born on 12 September 1951 at Akrusu Saisi, a town in the Manya Krobo District of the Eastern Region of Ghana. His primary education was at the Akrusu Saisi Roman Catholic Primary School and the Asesewa Roman Catholic Middle School. His secondary education was at the Saint Martin's Secondary School at Adoagyiri-Nsawam where he obtained the General Certificate of Education Ordinary Level in 1971. His basic teacher training was at the Mount Mary Training College at Somanya-Krobo in the Eastern Region. He then attended what is now the University of Education, Winneba between 1992 and 1996, obtaining a diploma in education. He completed a Bachelor of Education degree in 1999 at the same institution.

Educational work
Stephen Kwao was assistant headmaster at various Asesewaa Roman Catholic school between 1977 and 1985. He became the headmaster of the Asesewa Roman Catholic Complex Junior Secondary School between 1987 and 1992. After completing his diploma in education, he taught at the Krobo Girls’ Secondary School for two years. In 1999, he became assistant headmaster of the Dzomoa Roman Catholic Junior Secondary School. He later became a deputy director at the Ghana Education Service.

Politics
Kwao became active in party politics from the onset of the fourth Republic. He was the constituency chairman of the National Democratic Congress (NDC) between 1992 and 1993. He contested in the 2000 Ghanaian parliamentary election on the ticket of the NDC, winning by a margin of 8,644. He successfully retained his seat in the December 2004 election with a total of 15,764 making 60.90% of the total votes cast. He maintained his seat again in the 2008 Ghanaian general elections with a total of 14,398 making 66.87% of the total votes cast. In 2009, President Mills appointed Kwao as Minister for Employment and Social Welfare. He was moved to the Office of the President as a Minister of State in a cabinet reshuffle in January 2010.

Personal
Stephen Kwao is a Christian and is married with four children.

References

See also
List of Mills government ministers
National Democratic Congress

Living people
1951 births
Government ministers of Ghana
Ghanaian schoolteachers
Ghanaian MPs 2001–2005
Ghanaian MPs 2009–2013
Ghanaian educators
National Democratic Congress (Ghana) politicians
University of Education, Winneba alumni
Ghanaian Christians
21st-century Ghanaian politicians